The 1960 Roller Hockey World Cup was the fourteenth roller hockey world cup, organized by the Fédération Internationale de Patinage a Roulettes (now under the name of Fédération Internationale de Roller Sports). It was contested by 10 national teams (8 from Europe, 1 from Africa and 1 from South America). All the games were played in the city of Madrid, in Spain, the chosen city to host the World Cup.

Results

Standings

See also
 FIRS Roller Hockey World Cup

External links
 1960 World Cup in rink-hockey.net historical database

Roller Hockey World Cup
International roller hockey competitions hosted by Spain
1960 in Spanish sport
1960 in roller hockey